Patrick von Gunten (born February 10, 1985) is a Swiss former professional ice hockey defenceman, who played in the Swiss National League A (NLA) with EHC Kloten.

Playing career
Von Gunten first played professionally with hometown club, EHC Biel of the National League B, for four seasons before transferring to the Kloten Flyers in the 2005–06 season. In the 2011–12 season, von Gunten played a single year abroad in the Swedish Elitserien with Frölunda HC.

Despite establishing himself within the Frölunda blueline, von Gunten opted to return to the Kloten Flyers the following season on February 24, 2012. After initially agreeing to a two-year deal, von Gunten contract was voided and was re-signed to an improved four-year deal on June 29, 2012.

On 29 January 2018, von Gunten announced his immediate retirement after 12 seasons with EHC Kloten due to chronic hip and back injuries.

Career statistics

Regular season and playoffs

International

References

External links

1985 births
Living people
EHC Biel players
Frölunda HC players
EHC Kloten players
Swiss ice hockey defencemen
Olympic ice hockey players of Switzerland
Ice hockey players at the 2010 Winter Olympics
Ice hockey players at the 2014 Winter Olympics
People from Biel/Bienne
Sportspeople from the canton of Bern